Conisania andalusica , Barrett's marbled coronet is a moth of the family Noctuidae. It was described by Otto Staudinger in 1859. It is found in Ireland, Great Britain, Germany and on the Iberian Peninsula. Outside of Europe, it is found in North Africa.

The wingspan is 35–39 mm for males and 39 mm for females. Forewing dark grey, mixed with ochreous; the two upper stigmata and a patch beneath them beyond claviform palest; hindwing blackish; the antennae of the male are said to bear strongly developed teeth. It was described from the Sierra Nevada in Spain. This species is very similar to Conisania luteago and separable only by genitalic characters.

Adults are on wing from June to August.

The larvae feed on flowering plants in the genus Silene.

Subspecies
Conisania andalusica andalusica
Conisania andalusica barrettii (Doubleday, 1864) (Ireland)
Conisania andalusica zernyi (Draudt, 1934) (Morocco)

References

External links

"Conisania andalusica (Staudinger, 1859)". Insecta.pro
Lepiforum e.V. Images and scan of original description

Moths described in 1859
Hadenini
Moths of Europe
Taxa named by Otto Staudinger